Natalie Cole en Español is the 20th and final studio album by Natalie Cole, released on June 25, 2013 through Verve Records. Produced by the Cuban American composer Rudy Pérez, it is her first and only Spanish album and her first record released following her kidney transplant in 2009. The album is a follow-up to her third Christmas album Caroling, Caroling: Christmas with Natalie Cole. Natalie Cole en Español consists of twelve tracks, which are cover versions of Spanish standards. The album features duets with Juan Luis Guerra, Chris Botti, Arthur Hanlon, Andrea Bocelli and a posthumous duet with her father Nat King Cole.

Background

Cole had expressed interest in recording a Spanish album for nearly a decade but her label Capitol rejected her pitch and told her "the timing wasn't right". David Foster, with whom she had previously worked with on Unforgettable... with Love (1991), encouraged to attempt to record the album again. Cole cited Salvadoran nurse Esther as one of the primary influences for the recording of the album. Cole received a kidney transplant from Esther's niece in 2009 and referred to her connection with the nurse as causing her to be "drawn even more to Latin people, Latin programs". She added her connection to the Salvadoran family led her to "feel like [she's] part Latino now" and "(made) the desire to make this record become even stronger".

Weary of comparisons to her father's 1958 Spanish album Cole Español, Cole described her album as "not [being] a tribute to my father as much as it is a tribute to Latin music because of my father". During the recording of the album, Pérez served as Cole's language coach. Cole said "Black people and Hispanic people have the same kind of feel for passion, for music, for fun, for heart." She expressed a love for language by listing "I love French ... I love Portuguese, I love Italiano[,]" but emphasized that "for [her] right now is Español".

In the recording sessions, Pérez translated the lyrics into English to allow Cole to capture the emotions of the songs. Cole recalled on the first days of recording that she cried as "the translation of these Spanish lyrics is like poetry." When listening to the album, she found that "[she] liked [her]self singing in Spanish". She compared the recording process to that of Unforgettable... with Love as it allowed her to step out of her comfort zone to create what she viewed as art.

Reception

Critical response 

Natalie Cole en Español received generally favorable reviews from music critics. Andy Kellman of AllMusic described the album as not being "a mere throwback to a brief phase in Nat's career". Kellman called it "a likable diversion from her norm" and commended her for using zest to make up for her lack of fluency. JazzTimes' Christopher Loudon commended Cole's "deeper emotional connection to the lyrics" in comparison to her father's Spanish albums. Loudon praised the album as "all slickly grand-scale, yet it works satisfyingly well". Soultracks' Justin Kantor wrote that the album is "a polished set largely  baladas romanticas with sweeping orchestration and spicy, yet decidedly controlled, vocal performances". Kantor found certain songs required "a tad more rhythmic creativity and free-spirited singing", but recommended the overall product to her fans.

Track listing

Personnel 

 Natalie Cole – lead vocals
 Ana Cristina – additional backing vocals 
 Casey Cole – additional backing vocals
 Timolin Cole – additional backing vocals 
 Nat King Cole – sampled vocals (3)
 Andrea Bocelli – lead vocals (5)
 Jochem van der Saag – programming
 Clay Perry – acoustic piano (1, 6, 7)
 Rudy Pérez – acoustic piano (2, 3, 4, 9, 10), additional keyboards (8), keyboards (12), additional backing vocals 
 Arthur Hanlon – acoustic piano (8)
 Janina Rosado – acoustic piano (11), synthesizers (11), synthesizer programming (11)
 Juan Vicente Zambrano – additional keyboards (8)
 Rene Toledo – nylon guitar (1, 12), guitars (2)
 Brian Monroney – additional guitars (1, 12), guitars (2, 3, 4, 6-10)
 Juan Luis Guerra – electric guitar (11), lead vocals (11), choir vocals 
 Ramón Stagnaro – acoustic guitar (11)
 Julio Hernandez – bass (1, 2, 4, 6, 9, 10, 12)
 Chuck Bergeron – upright bass (3, 7)
 Abednego DeLos Santos – bass (11)
 Orlando Hernandez – drums (1-4, 6, 7, 9, 10)
 Eduardo Rodriguez – percussion (1-4, 6-10)
 Juan De La Cruz – bongos (11), maracas (11)
 Isidro Bobadilla – chimes
 Mike Brignola – baritone saxophone (1, 6-9)
 Gary Keller – alto saxophone (1, 6-9)
 Ed Calle – tenor saxophone (1, 3, 6-9)
 Nadine Asin – flute (4, 7)
 Paul Green – clarinet (7) 
 John Kricker – trombone (1, 6-9)
 Francisco Dimus – flugelhorn, trumpet
 Jim Hacker – trumpet (1, 6-9)
 Chris Botti – trumpet solo (9)
 Victor Mitrov – trumpet (11)

String section
 Violins – Priscilla Gomez, Giorni Liriano, Guillermo Mota, Beckyrene Perez and Rosanna Rosario 
 Cellos – Milena Zigkovic and Georgina Betancourt 
 Violas – Anaris Iznaga and Alberto Iznaga 
 Concertmaster – Glenn Basham

Charts and certifications

Weekly charts

Certifications

References

2013 albums
Natalie Cole albums
Spanish-language albums
Verve Records albums
Albums produced by Rudy Pérez
Latin pop albums by American artists